The 2015 BNP Paribas Open (also known as the 2015 Indian Wells Masters) was a professional tennis tournament played at Indian Wells, California, in March 2015. It was the 42nd edition of the men's event (27th for the women), known as the BNP Paribas Open, and was classified as an ATP World Tour Masters 1000 event on the 2015 ATP World Tour and a Premier Mandatory event on the 2015 WTA Tour. Both the men's and the women's events took place at the Indian Wells Tennis Garden in Indian Wells, United States, from March 11 through March 22, 2015, on outdoor hard courts.

Points and prize money

Point distribution

 Players with byes receive first-round points.

Prize money

ATP singles main-draw entrants

Seeds

The following are the seeded players. Rankings and seedings are according to ATP rankings on March 9, 2015.

Other entrants

The following players received wildcards into the singles main draw:
  Thanasi Kokkinakis
  Austin Krajicek
  Denis Kudla
  Ryan Harrison
  Tim Smyczek

The following player received entry using a protected ranking into the singles main draw:
  Mardy Fish

The following players received entry from the qualifying draw:
  Michael Berrer 
  Alex Bolt 
  Borna Ćorić
  Frank Dancevic 
  Thiemo de Bakker
  James Duckworth 
  Victor Hănescu 
  Filip Krajinović 
  Jürgen Melzer
  Dennis Novikov 
  Édouard Roger-Vasselin 
  Mischa Zverev

The following player received entry as a lucky loser:
  Daniel Gimeno Traver

Withdrawals
Before the tournament
  Nicolás Almagro → replaced by  Ivan Dodig
  Carlos Berlocq → replaced by  Dustin Brown
  David Goffin (rib pain) → replaced by  Igor Sijsling
  Tommy Haas (right shoulder) → replaced by  Tatsuma Ito
  Paolo Lorenzi → replaced by  Marinko Matosevic
  Leonardo Mayer → replaced by  Daniel Gimeno Traver
  Gaël Monfils (left knee injury) → replaced by  Robin Haase
  Radek Štěpánek → replaced by  Marcos Baghdatis 
  Janko Tipsarević → replaced by  Andreas Haider-Maurer
  Jo-Wilfried Tsonga → replaced by  Sam Groth

During the tournament
  Bernard Tomic

Retirements

  Richard Gasquet
  Mikhail Kukushkin
  Jiří Veselý

ATP doubles main-draw entrants

Seeds 

1 Rankings as of March 9, 2015.

Other entrants
The following pairs received wildcards into the doubles main draw:
  Roger Federer /  Michael Lammer
  Thanasi Kokkinakis /  Andy Murray

The following pair received entry as alternates:
  Santiago Giraldo /  Lukáš Rosol

Withdrawals
Before the tournament
  Marin Čilić

WTA singles main-draw entrants

Seeds 
The following are the seeded players. Rankings and seedings are according to WTA rankings on March 2, 2015.  Points before are as of March 9, 2015.

Other entrants
The following players received wildcards into the singles main draw:
  Louisa Chirico 
  Irina Falconi
  Nicole Gibbs
  Bethanie Mattek-Sands
  Grace Min
  Taylor Townsend
  Sachia Vickery 
  Serena Williams

The following player received entry using a protected ranking into the singles main draw:
  Vera Zvonareva

The following players received entry from the qualifying draw:
  Lara Arruabarrena
  Daria Gavrilova
  Polona Hercog
  Lucie Hradecká
  Ons Jabeur
  Sesil Karatantcheva
  Kateryna Kozlova
  Yulia Putintseva 
  Evgeniya Rodina
  Lesia Tsurenko
  Alison Van Uytvanck
  Zhu Lin

Withdrawals
Before the tournament
  Irina-Camelia Begu → replaced by  Kateřina Siniaková
  Dominika Cibulková (achilles surgery) → replaced by  Donna Vekić
  Casey Dellacqua → replaced by  Yanina Wickmayer 
  Petra Kvitová (exhaustion) → replaced by  Chanelle Scheepers 
  Peng Shuai (back injury) → replaced by  Zheng Saisai 
  Laura Robson → replaced by  Aleksandra Krunić 
  Yaroslava Shvedova → replaced by  Francesca Schiavone
  Zhang Shuai → replaced by  Alla Kudryavtseva

During the tournament
  Serena Williams

Retirements
  Lesia Tsurenko

WTA doubles main-draw entrants

Seeds 

1 Rankings as of March 2, 2015.

Other entrants
The following pairs received wildcards into the doubles main draw:
  Daniela Hantuchová /  Karin Knapp
  Ana Ivanovic /  Angelique Kerber
  Svetlana Kuznetsova /  CoCo Vandeweghe
  Sloane Stephens /  Taylor Townsend

Withdrawals
During the tournament
  Taylor Townsend (left leg injury)

Champions

Men's singles

  Novak Djokovic defeated  Roger Federer, 6–3, 6–7(5–7), 6–2

Women's singles

  Simona Halep defeated  Jelena Janković, 2–6, 7–5, 6–4

Men's doubles

  Vasek Pospisil /  Jack Sock defeated  Simone Bolelli /  Fabio Fognini, 6–4, 6–7(3–7), [10–7]

Women's doubles

  Martina Hingis /  Sania Mirza defeated  Ekaterina Makarova /  Elena Vesnina, 6–3, 6–4

References

External links

Association of Tennis Professionals (ATP) tournament profile

 
2015 BNP Paribas Open
2015 ATP World Tour
2015 WTA Tour
2015 in American tennis
2015 in sports in California